Anthony Jordan Martial (born 5 December 1995) is a French professional footballer who plays as a forward for Premier League club Manchester United and the France national team.

After playing youth football for Les Ulis, Martial began his professional career at Lyon, before transferring to AS Monaco in 2013 for a fee of €6 million. He was a member of Monaco's squad for two seasons, and signed for Manchester United in 2015 for an initial fee of £36 million which could potentially rise to £57.6 million; making it the highest fee paid for a teenager in football history at the time. He was the recipient of the 2015 Golden Boy Award for the best under-21 player in Europe. 

In his debut season with Manchester United, he won the 2015–16 FA Cup and established himself as one of the most exciting prospects in the world. His trajectory stalled the following season, but he won more trophies under the guidance of Jose Mourinho. Martial had his best ever goalscoring season in 2019–20, netting 23 times in all competitions, and he was awarded Manchester United Players' Player of the Year. However, his form declined in seasons after that and in January 2022, Martial was loaned out to Spanish club Sevilla until the end of the 2021–22 season.

A youth international for France from under-16 to under-21 level, Martial made his senior debut in 2015. He was named in their squad for UEFA Euro 2016, appearing in the final as France were defeated by Portugal.

Club career

Early career and Lyon
Born in Massy, Essonne, Martial spent his youth years with Paris-based CO Les Ulis from 2001, the same team who produced French internationals Thierry Henry and Patrice Evra. Evra closely monitored the progress of Martial, and allowed him to play in one of his pairs of football boots at the age of 12. At the same age, Martial trialled at Manchester City.

At just 14 years old in 2009 he was spotted by scouts from the Olympique Lyonnais academy and joined it the same year. During his second season in the Under-17 team he distinguished himself by scoring 32 goals in 21 games, which resulted in a call-up to the France national under-17 football team for the 2012 UEFA European Under-17 Championship in Slovenia.

He made his professional debut for Lyon on 6 December 2012, in a Europa League group stage match against Hapoel Ironi Kiryat Shmona, replacing goalscorer Yassine Benzia for the final 10 minutes of a 2–0 victory at the Stade de Gerland. His first Ligue 1 game was on 3 February 2013 against Ajaccio, when he came on as a substitute in the 79th minute for Rachid Ghezzal in a 3–1 away loss. He made two further appearances from the bench that season.

AS Monaco

On 30 June 2013, AS Monaco announced they had signed Martial to a three-year contract for a fee of €5 million plus bonuses. On 24 November, he made his first league appearance for the club at the age of 17, replacing Radamel Falcao after 63 minutes and playing a part in Mounir Obbadi's goal which gave victory away to FC Nantes. He scored his first goal for the principality club on his first start, a 2–0 win over Rennes at the Stade Louis II six days later. His campaign was disrupted by a sprained ankle against Valenciennes in December. On 27 January 2014, he extended his contract until June 2018.

In his second season at Monaco, Martial scored nine goals in 36 Ligue 1 games, starting on 5 October 2014 when as a substitute for Lucas Ocampos, he gained a 1–1 draw at reigning champions Paris Saint-Germain with a last-minute strike from close range. He scored twice against a 10-man Bastia on 13 March 2015 in a 3–0 home victory. On 26 June, he further extended his link with the team until 2019.

On 4 August 2015, Martial scored his first goal in European competition, in a 4–0 home win over BSC Young Boys in the third qualifying round of the UEFA Champions League; Monaco advanced 7–1 on aggregate.

Manchester United

Transfer
On 1 September 2015, Martial completed a move to Manchester United for £36 million, potentially rising to £58 million, on a four-year contract with the option of another year. This was the highest transfer fee paid for a teenager, breaking the previous record of £27 million United paid for Luke Shaw a year earlier, and that Paris Saint-Germain had paid for Marquinhos in 2013. United paid £36 million up front for Martial, but his contract contains three bonus clauses worth £7.2 million each, taking the potential fee to £57.6 million. The clauses each relate to certain accomplishments being achieved in the next four years, including if Martial scores 25 goals during that span, racks up 25 caps for France or wins the Ballon d'Or before June 2019. Manager Louis van Gaal called Martial an acquisition for United's future rather than for immediate use, and called the transfer fee "ridiculous", alleging that Manchester United regularly had to pay £10 million more than other teams.

Upon signing, Martial said, "I'm so excited to join United, I have always wanted to play in the Premier League and to join the biggest club in the world is what every young footballer dreams of." Van Gaal stated, "Anthony is a naturally talented, young, multi-functional forward with great potential. I believe this is the club for him to continue his development." The fee was reportedly met with astonishment by the French public.

2015–16 season

Martial made his debut in the North-West Derby at Old Trafford on 12 September as a 65th-minute substitute for Juan Mata, and scored the final goal of a 3–1 win over Liverpool. Van Gaal called it a "marvellous goal". Eight days later, in his first Premier League start, he scored twice in an away win, 3–2 at Southampton. On 23 September, again as a replacement for Mata, Martial scored his fourth goal in four games for his new club, concluding a 3–0 win over Ipswich Town in the third round of the League Cup. Martial's early impact was praised by former United manager Sir Alex Ferguson, who stated that "he can do anything".

Martial won his first individual honour at United as he picked up the 'PFA Fan's Player of the Month' for September, in which he notched up three goals from two matches. A few days later, he gained his second trophy at United, as his strike against Liverpool earned him the club's 'Goal of the Month' for September. He was also named Premier League Player of the Month for September, the third-youngest player to receive the award after Micah Richards and Michael Owen.

On 21 October, in a Champions League group stage match away to CSKA Moscow, Martial gave away a penalty – which David de Gea saved from Roman Eremenko – and later equalised to confirm a 1–1 draw. He was awarded the Golden Boy as Europe's best under-21 player on 19 December.

Martial was key in a 2–1 win against Everton in the FA Cup semi-final at Wembley Stadium on 23 April 2016: he assisted the first goal by Marouane Fellaini and scored an added-time winner. He finished the season as the club's top scorer in both the league and overall competitions with 11 goals and 17 goals respectively.

2016–17 season

Martial retained his starting berth at Manchester United under new manager José Mourinho, starting ahead of in-form teammate Marcus Rashford on the left wing for the opening few games of the season. The forward, however, lost his place in the starting line-up after several underwhelming performances, with the club tentatively attributing Martial's difficulties to ongoing problems in his personal life. Nevertheless, on 2 October 2016, Martial came off the bench at Old Trafford to score United's only goal—his first of the new season—against Stoke City, a game that ended in a 1–1 draw.

On 30 November 2016, Martial was recalled to the side to face West Ham in the EFL Cup after receiving warnings about his starting spot in previous weeks from manager José Mourinho, he responded by scoring two goals in a 4–1 win to send United into the semi-final of the competition. Being in and out of the team for a couple of months, Martial was rumoured to leave Manchester United in the summer, but on 6 February he made it clear on his Twitter account, tweeting: "the paper's are wrong don't listen to them". Martial returned to the starting line-up against Watford at Old Trafford on 11 February by providing an assist to Juan Mata and later scoring a goal for himself in the 60th minute, he was later declared the man of the match. On 26 February, he was named in the starting XI that faced Southampton at Wembley Stadium for the 2017 EFL Cup Final, which United won 3–2. The victory earned Martial his third piece of silverware for United. In May, he won the first European trophy of his career, coming on as a substitute in the 2017 UEFA Europa League Final.

2017–18 season
After a successful spell for Manchester United towards the end of last season, winning the League Cup and Europa League, Martial started the season as a substitute for most matches. Despite this Martial managed to score from the bench in United's first two league matches against West Ham United and Swansea City, and again later against Everton; with all three matches ending in a 4–0 win for United. Martial's first start of the season came on 20 September in a 4–1 win over Burton upon Trent in the League Cup in which he also scored. Martial repeated this a week later in the Champions League, scoring in a 4–1 win over CSKA Moscow. In October Martial scored United's only goal in their win over Tottenham and again in November against Watford and Newcastle United. In January, Martial scored again against Everton away, scored against Stoke City and provide the winning goal against Burnley. However following the January transfer season, Martial began to fall out of favour following the signing of Chilean forward Alexis Sánchez on 22 January. A lack of game time saw Martial fail to produce another goal for the club all season. Because of this, there was heavy speculation that Martial would leave Manchester United during the summer transfer season.

2018–19 season
Martial made his first competitive appearance for Manchester United's 2018–19 season in their 3–2 loss to Brighton in the Premier League. Through August and September, Martial made three other substitute appearance in the Premier League until the September's final game against West Ham United saw him make the starting eleven. However two weeks prior saw Martial start in Manchester United's Champions League opener and score his first goal of the season in a 3–0 win against Young Boys of Bern. Martial's first league goal came in a 3–2 comeback against Newcastle United where he also started. After that match Martial started and scored in every Premier League game up to the November International Break, scoring against Bournemouth, Everton, two goals against Chelsea, and a penalty goal in the Manchester derby. This spell of goal scoring saw Martial become one of seven players to have scored in five consecutive league games for Manchester United. Martial also won Manchester United's October Player of the Month award.

On 24 November, Martial started in United's goalless draw with Crystal Palace, playing the full 90 minutes. This came after speculation that he would miss the game due to an injury pick up on international duty. Martial also played the full 90 minutes against Champions League opponents Young Boys, which United won 1–0, securing their place in the knockout stage. After missing United's tie with Southampton, Martial played in the club's home game against Arsenal in which he scored his eighth goal of the season with the match ending in a 2–2 draw. On 17 December 2018, United triggered an option to extend Martial's contract that would keep him at the club until 2020. On 22 December, under new manager Ole Gunnar Solskjær, Martial scored his ninth of the season in a 5–1 victory over Cardiff City. On 25 January 2019, Martial scored Manchester United's third goal in a 3–1 win over Arsenal in the FA Cup Fourth Round; it was his first goal of 2019 and his 10th of the season.

On 31 January 2019, Martial signed a new five-year contract with Manchester United. On 9 February, Martial assisted Paul Pogba's opener before scoring United's second goal in a 3–0 win over Fulham. On 10 March, Martial returned as a substitute against Arsenal after sustaining an injury against PSG a month prior. Later that month he scored the second goal in a 2–1 win over Watford.

2019–20 season
Martial began the 2019–20 league season by starting and scoring Manchester United's second goal in a 4–0 victory over Chelsea at Old Trafford. He also scored in United's second match, a 1–1 draw away against Wolverhampton Wanderers on 19 August 2019. On his first start since returning from injury in August, Martial scored the winning penalty against Partizan Belgrade in late October, before scoring against Norwich City in a 3–1 victory the following weekend. On 24 June 2020, he scored his first senior hat-trick in a 3–0 home win against Sheffield United. This was United's first Premier League hat-trick since 22 April 2013, when Robin van Persie did so against Aston Villa en route of sealing the club's most recent league title to date.

2020–21 season
On 4 October 2020, Martial received the first red card of his career for hitting out at Erik Lamela during United's 1–6 loss to Tottenham Hotspur in the Premier League and was later banned for three domestic games. In the UEFA Champions League group stage match against RB Leipzig on 28 October, Martial scored his first goal of the season, slotting home United's fourth goal in a 5–0 win. He scored his first league goal of the season on 17 December 2020 in a 3–2 away win against Sheffield United. He scored two goals – the only one to do so – in United's Premier League record-equalling 9–0 home win against Southampton on 2 February 2021.

2021–22 season
Martial scored his first goal of the season on 2 October, in a 1–1 draw against Everton.

Sevilla loan
On 25 January 2022, Martial was loaned out to Spanish club Sevilla until the end of the season. He scored 1 goal in 12 games for the club, in the Europa League; he did not score in La Liga.

International career

Youth

Martial scored five goals as France topped their qualification group for the 2012 UEFA European Under-17 Championship: two goals in a 5–0 win over the Faroe Islands, and a hat-trick against Northern Ireland in Luxembourg. He added two more in elite round victories against Switzerland and Sweden to confirm qualification. He netted once in a group stage exit at the final tournament in Slovenia, a 2–2 opening game draw with Iceland at the Domžale Sports Park.

Martial played all five games for France under-19 at the 2013 European Championship in Lithuania, finishing as runners-up to Serbia. He was one of five Frenchmen selected in the Team of the Tournament.

Senior
On 26 August 2015, Martial was called up to the senior France squad for the first time, for friendlies against Portugal and Serbia in the following month. He made his debut in the former on 4 September at Lisbon's Estádio José Alvalade, replacing Karim Benzema for the final 16 minutes of a 1–0 win. On 11 October, Martial made his first start for Les Bleus in a 2–1 win against Denmark at Parken Stadium, Copenhagen, and assisted the opening goal by Olivier Giroud.

Due to Martial's performances in the 2015–16 season with Manchester United, he earned a spot on France's 23-man squad for Euro 2016, in which France were the tournament runners up. On 17 May 2018, Martial was named on the standby list for the 23-man French squad for the 2018 World Cup in Russia. However, he did not make the final squad for the tournament which saw France as champions for the second time.

Style of play
Aziz Benaaddane, one of Martial's coaches at Les Ulis, told the BBC Sport in 2015 that as a six-year-old, Martial was able to run in a straight line to the goal: "We've got 400 youngsters playing for us but a talent like that arrives only once every five or six years. We felt it, we saw the potential and we pushed him". Mahamadou Niakite, another coach, added that Martial was put in higher age groups, as at the age of six he had the ability of most eight-year-olds, and at around the age of 12–13 he was focused on becoming a professional.

According to journalist Philippe Auclair, Martial plays in a style similar to former French international Thierry Henry, with speed and technical ability both in wide positions and up front. Henry himself praised Martial after his goalscoring debut, while Martial himself refuted the comparison, saying "I don't think we have the same type of game – he was very quick whereas I rely more on power and technique. But it's always good to be compared to great players".

In the aftermath of France's 2–1 win over Denmark in October 2015, Fenerbahçe defender Simon Kjær was reportedly stunned after playing against him to learn that Martial was just 19. He told French newspaper L'Équipe, "He's really good for 19. I didn't know him when I was in France. He's very, very hard to mark because he knows how to do a lot of things. Not only is he quick, but he's also technically good."

Although he has been used as a centre-forward, he primarily plays on the left flank. Martial, for his part, has said that he prefers to play up front, but that "if the coach puts me on the wing then that means it is better for the team and for me that is the most important thing."

In 2019, Christopher Simpson of Bleacher Report noted that Martial "...has pace to burn and the dribbling skills to accompany it, making him very difficult to defend against, and he's a composed finisher in front of goal too."

Personal life
Martial is of Guadeloupean descent. His older brother, Johan, is a professional defender, who represented France up to under-20 level. He has another older brother, Dorian, who was the captain of the senior team at Les Ulis. The Martial family placed high emphasis on the education of their children. His youth coaches describe him as a shy and quiet person. Martial is a Roman Catholic.

Career statistics

Club

International

France score listed first, score column indicates score after each Martial goal

Honours
Manchester United
FA Cup: 2015–16
EFL Cup: 2016–17
FA Community Shield: 2016
UEFA Europa League: 2016–17; runner-up: 2020–21
UEFA Super Cup runner-up: 2017

France U19
UEFA European Under-19 Championship runner-up: 2013

France
 UEFA Nations League: 2020–21
UEFA European Championship runner-up: 2016

Individual
Golden Boy: 2015
Premier League Player of the Month: September 2015
PFA Fans' Premier League Player of the Month: September 2015
UEFA European Under-19 Championship Team of the Tournament: 2013
Manchester United Goal of the Season: 2015–16 (vs. Liverpool, 12 September 2015)
Manchester United Players' Player of the Year: 2019–20

References

External links

Manchester United profile
 
 

1995 births
Living people
French people of Guadeloupean descent
People from Massy, Essonne
Black French sportspeople
Footballers from Essonne
French Roman Catholics
French footballers
Association football forwards
Olympique Lyonnais players
AS Monaco FC players
Manchester United F.C. players
Sevilla FC players
Championnat National 2 players
Ligue 1 players
Premier League players
La Liga players
UEFA Europa League winning players
France youth international footballers
France under-21 international footballers
France international footballers
UEFA Euro 2016 players
UEFA Nations League-winning players
French expatriate footballers
French expatriate sportspeople in Monaco
French expatriate sportspeople in England
French expatriate sportspeople in Spain
Expatriate footballers in Monaco
Expatriate footballers in England
Expatriate footballers in Spain
Golden Boy winners
FA Cup Final players